The Toronto Lawn Tennis Club is a private social and athletic club in Toronto, Ontario, Canada. Founded in 1876, it has a long history of tennis competition. It is located at 44 Price Street, in the affluent Rosedale neighbourhood of Toronto.  

The club hosted the first ever National Tennis Championship of Canada and has hosted 2 Davis Cup ties.

Established in 1874 by I.F. Hellmuth, the club that year played host to a tournament (for gentlemen's singles) that over time became the Canadian Open tennis championship, now known as the National Bank Open. 

The Toronto Lawn Tennis Club also played host to the first Davis Cup tie played in Canada, in July 1921.  Australia swept aside Canada 5-0, with Canadian Henri Laframboise taking the only two sets dropped by the James Anderson-led Aussies.  Six years later to the month, Jack Wright and Willard Crocker-led Canada defeated Cuba 3-2 in an American Zone semi-final contest.  Both Davis Cup ties were competed on red clay.

The Toronto Lawn Tennis Club expanded its facilities in 1960 to include squash.

Sources
Canada's Davis Cup record
Toronto Lawn Tennis Club, 'About Us' guest page
Squash Canada

Sport in Toronto
Squash venues
Tennis venues in Canada
Tennis in Ontario
Clubs and societies based in Toronto
Multi-sport clubs in Canada
Tennis clubs
History of Toronto